The scarlet-browed tanager (Heterospingus xanthopygius) is a species of bird in the family Thraupidae.

It is found in Panama, Colombia and Ecuador. Its natural habitat is subtropical or tropical moist lowland forests.

References

scarlet-browed tanager
Birds of the Tumbes-Chocó-Magdalena
scarlet-browed tanager
scarlet-browed tanager
Taxonomy articles created by Polbot